Thirumarugal Natesapillai Rajarathinam Pillai (27 August 1898 – 12 December 1956) or TNR was an Indian Carnatic musician, nadaswaram maestro, vocalist and film actor. He was popularly known as "Nadaswara Chakravarthi" (literally, the Emperor of Nadaswaram)

Film career 
He featured in the main role as the 16th century Tamil poet Kalamegam. He also appeared briefly as a Nadhaswaram player in the film Thiruneelakantar (1939 film).

Titles, honors and service 

Rajarathnam Pillai was a recipient of many titles, none of them official or academic. He was popularly known as Nadaswara Chakravarthi meaning Emperor of Nagaswaram. He is believed to have promoted nadaswaram and tavil players for recognition as musicians in their own right and it is thought that his lead was recognised when the Madras Music Academy conferred the title of Sangeetha Kalanidhi (doctor of music) on fellow nagaswaram exponent Thiruvizhimizhalai Subramania Pillai in 1956. In spite of his fame and following, there is no formal or official account of his life readily available in Tamil or another language.

References 

1898 births
1956 deaths
People from Tiruvarur district
Male Carnatic singers
Carnatic singers
Tamil musicians
Nadaswaram players
20th-century Indian male singers
20th-century Indian singers
Recipients of the Sangeet Natak Akademi Award